John F. Larkin  (born 1963), is the former Attorney General for Northern Ireland.

He was the first person to hold the office separately since its functions were assumed by the Attorney General for England and Wales in 1972. He was the first holder of the office not to be a politician sitting in either the Parliament of Northern Ireland, at Stormont, or the UK Parliament.

Early life
Larkin was born in Belfast and educated at St Mary's Christian Brothers' Grammar School and Queen's University Belfast, where he read law. He was subsequently called to the Bar of Northern Ireland and practised as a barrister.

Career
In the early 1980s he was involved in politics as a member of the Alliance Party of Northern Ireland, but ceased to be active as his legal career took off. In 1989, at the age of 25, Larkin was appointed as Reid Professor of Criminal Law, Criminology and Penal Law at Trinity College Dublin. He returned to Northern Ireland in the 1990s to work at the Northern Ireland Bar, specialising in administrative law, civil liberties and human rights, competition and constitutional law, defamation and judicial review.

On 20 November 2013 he recommended eliminating prosecutions, inquests or inquiries into events which preceded the Good Friday Agreement of 1998. Certain politicians and policemen accused him of attempting to violate international law.

On 25 November he received a letter from Jim Allister regarding Traditional Unionist Voice allegations against the BBC to which he replied three days later saying that it would not be appropriate for him to comment on that issue.

On 10 June 2014 he attended hearing on the so-called on-the-run letters.

Resignation
John Larkin stood down on 30th Jun 2020 as Attorney General and was replaced by Brenda King, First Legislative Counsel in the Executive Office.

References

1963 births
Living people
Alumni of Queen's University Belfast
Attorneys General for Northern Ireland
Academics of Trinity College Dublin
People educated at St. Mary's Christian Brothers' Grammar School, Belfast
Lawyers from Belfast
Northern Ireland King's Counsel